Julien Berol (born 9 September 2001) is a French swimmer. He competed in the men's 100 metre freestyle event at the 2020 European Aquatics Championships, in Budapest, Hungary.

References

External links
 

2001 births
Living people
French male freestyle swimmers
Place of birth missing (living people)
21st-century French people
Swimmers at the 2022 Mediterranean Games
Mediterranean Games competitors for France